Babice is a municipality and village in Prachatice District in the South Bohemian Region of the Czech Republic. It has about 100 inhabitants.

Administrative parts
The hamlet of Zvěřetice is an administrative part of Babice.

References

External links

Villages in Prachatice District